Julia Penelope (June 19, 1941 – January 19, 2013) was an American linguist, author, and philosopher. She was part of an international movement of critical thinkers on lesbian and feminist issues. A self-described "white, working-class, fat butch dyke who never passed," she started what she called "rabble rousing" when she was a young woman.

Early life and education
Julia Penelope Stanley was born at Jackson Memorial Hospital in Miami, Florida to Frederick William Stanley and his wife, Frances.

In 1959, she was asked to leave Florida State University in Tallahassee because of her lesbianism. She transferred to the University of Miami, where, eight weeks later, investigations of the Charlie Johns Investigating Committee on Communism and Homosexuality led to her expulsion on the grounds of suspected lesbianism. She then earned a BA in English and linguistics from City College of New York in 1966, followed by graduate work at the University of Texas at Austin where she received a doctoral degree in English in 1971.

Career
Her first teaching position was at the University of Georgia in Athens, in 1968. She went on to teach for eleven years at the University of Nebraska–Lincoln, where she was passed over for promotions because her research on lesbians was deemed "too narrow". She "was a separatist whose lesbian publications were often controversial, criticizing sadomasochism and other practices within lesbian communities." After relocating to Texas, she pursued a career as a freelance lexicographer, and a copy editor for commercial presses.

Activism
An activist and an organizer, Penelope attended the first conference of the Gay Academic Union in 1973 at the City College of New York. She was a delegate to the National Women's Conference in Houston in 1977, and she participated in the planning meetings that led to the founding of the Lesbian Herstory Archives. She founded several activist groups, including the "Lincoln Legion of Lesbians" and "Lesbians for Lesbians." She was one of the first scholars to teach women's studies courses, including Twentieth-Century Lesbian Novels and Feminist Literary Criticism.

Penelope insisted on lesbian visibility in the academy, bringing Adrienne Rich, Audre Lorde, Mary Daly, Pat Parker, Chrystos and others to the University of Nebraska. She encouraged Catherine Nicholson and Harriet Desmoines to bring the lesbian-feminist journal Sinister Wisdom to Lincoln. In 1977, at the Modern Language Association (MLA) convention in Chicago, she organized the "Lesbian Languages and Literatures" panel with Daly, Lorde, Judith McDaniel, and Adrienne Rich as speakers.

In 1988, she co-edited with Sarah Lucia Hoagland the first anthology on lesbian separatism, For Lesbians Only: A Separatist Anthology. As a lesbian separatist, Penelope was controversial among lesbians. According to her biography in Lesbian Histories and Cultures: An Encyclopedia (2000), she became disheartened by lesbian infighting and withdrew from lesbian writing.

She helped found the Lubbock County Green Party, and ran for Congress in 2003 as a Green candidate in Texas's 19th congressional district special election. Her platform emphasized environmental protection and opposition to war with Iraq as well as support for human rights.

Personal life
For a brief period of her life, Penelope was open about being a kept butch, "(a butch who is supported by another woman, often, but not always, a prostitute, a call girl, or the mistress of a wealthy man)".

She eventually settled in Lubbock, Texas.

Death
Julia Penelope, aged 71, died on January 19, 2013, in Texas.

Works

References

External links
  Julia Penelope Papers, ca. 1986-1999 at Rubenstein Library, Duke University Libraries
  Julia Penelope research files on the Language of the Homosexual Community study at Yale University Library, Manuscripts and Archives Repository
  Julia Penelope at Lesbian Poetry Archive
  Julia Penelope at Library of Congress
  Julia Penelope at LibraryThing
  Lesbiana – A Parallel Revolution by Myriam Fougère at Vimeo

1941 births
2013 deaths
American feminist writers
American anti–Iraq War activists
Lesbian feminists
Lesbian separatists
American lesbian writers
American LGBT rights activists
Texas Greens
University of Nebraska faculty